The 1943 Lafayette Leopards football team was an American football team that represented Lafayette College in the Middle Three Conference during the 1943 college football season. In its first  season under head coach Ben Wolfson, the team compiled a 4–1 record and won the Middle Three championship. Walter Sergy was the team captain. The team played its home games at Fisher Field in Easton, Pennsylvania.

Schedule

References

Lafayette
Lafayette Leopards football seasons
Lafayette Leopards football